The Signal may refer to:

 The Signal (2007 film), American horror film written and directed by David Bruckner, Dan Bush, and Jacob Gentry
 The Signal (2014 film), American science fiction thriller film directed by William Eubank
 The Signal (podcast), a Firefly and Serenity-focused podcast
 The Signal (radio program), a Canadian radio program
 The Signal (Sandra Nasic album), the debut solo album of German singer Sandra Nasic
 The Signal (Urthboy album), the second album from The Herd member Urthboy
 "The Signal", a season-four episode of the British-American animated television series The Amazing World of Gumball

Newspapers
 The Santa Clarita Valley Signal, a news media organization in Santa Clarita, California
 The Signal (college newspaper), the official student newspaper of Georgia State University
 The Signal, The College of New Jersey's student-run newspaper since 1855

See also
 Signal (disambiguation)